J. B. Joyce & Co, clockmakers, were founded in Shropshire in England. The company claim to be the oldest clock manufacturer in the world, originally established in 1690, and have been part of the Smith of Derby Group since 1965. The claim is challenged by another English firm of clockmakers, Thwaites & Reed, who claim to have been in continuous manufacture since before 1740, with antecedents to 1610.

History
William Joyce began in the North Shropshire village of Cockshutt making longcase clocks. The family business was handed down from father to son and in 1790 moved to High Street, Whitchurch, Shropshire. In 1904 J. B. Joyce moved to Station Road, Whitchurch. In 1834 Thomas Joyce made large clocks for local churches and public buildings. In 1849 the company copied the Big Ben escapement designed by Lord Grimthorpe. J. B. Joyce also installed synchronous electric clocks in a number of railway stations, including Liverpool’s Lime Street Station, Aberystwyth in Wales, and Carnforth in Lancashire. John Edgar Howard Smith (19071983), a former managing director of Smith of Derby Group, designed the first and subsequent synchronous electric movements for J. B. Joyce, and their associated electromechanical bell striking units.

In 1964, Norman Joyce, the last member of the Joyce family, retired and sold the company to Smith of Derby. During the 1970s, many of the mechanical clocks were changed to use the electric motors made by the Smith parent company. However, J. B. Joyce continued to operate as a separate company, with mainly heritage work being carried out in the factory up to 2012, when a timedbid auction was held to sell off surplus equipment, tools, and clock parts, at the Station Road premises. Interior designers, collectors of historic items, and aficionados of J. B. Joyce, joined to bid for a "piece of horological history".

Notable clocks

United Kingdom

Worldwide

Gallery

See also
 List of oldest companies
 Clock tower
 List of clocks
 Smith of Derby Group

References

Further reading

External links

1690 establishments in England
Clock manufacturing companies of the United Kingdom
Companies based in Shropshire
Companies established in 1690
Turret clock makers of the United Kingdom
Whitchurch, Shropshire